George A. Myers (March 5, 1859 -January 17, 1930) was a barber, state legislator, and political organizer in Ohio He was born in Baltimore, Maryland to Isaac Meyers and Emma V. née Morgan Meyers. He moved to Cleveland in 1879. He married twice and had two children. He was an advocate for civil rights and justice for African Americans.

References

Republican Party members of the Ohio House of Representatives
1859 births
1930 deaths